The City of Keilor was a local government area about  northwest of Melbourne, the state capital of Victoria, Australia.

History

Keilor was first incorporated as a road district on 3 March 1863. It became a shire on 22 December 1871, and was proclaimed a city on 29 April 1961. Its boundaries were relatively stable throughout its existence, however, parts of Essendon North were transferred to the City of Essendon in 1993.

On 15 July 1975, after a number of years of factional infighting, the council was suspended.

On 15 December 1994, the City of Keilor was abolished, and its area divided by the Maribyrnong River and the Albion-Jacana freight railway line; its eastern section was merged with the City of Essendon, to form the newly created City of Moonee Valley, while its western section was merged with parts of the City of Sunshine, including St Albans, to form the newly created City of Brimbank. Melbourne Airport and a small section of Tullamarine, north of Sharps Road, were transferred to the newly created City of Hume.

Wards

The City of Keilor was divided into three wards, each electing three councillors:

 Doutta Galla-Tullamarine Ward
 Maribyrnong Ward
 Niddrie Ward

Suburbs
 Airport West
 Avondale Heights
 Calder Park*
 Essendon West
 Kealba
 Keilor+
 Keilor Downs
 Keilor East
 Keilor North
 Keilor Park
 Kings Park
 Melbourne Airport (shared with the Shire of Bulla)
 Niddrie
 St Albans (shared with the City of Sunshine)
 Sydenham
 Taylors Lakes
 Tullamarine (shared with the City of Broadmeadows)

* Suburb gazetted since the amalgamation.
+ Council seat.

Population

* Estimate in the 1958 Victorian Year Book.

References

External links
 Victorian Places - Keilor

Keilor
1863 establishments in Australia
1994 disestablishments in Australia
City of Hume
City of Moonee Valley
City of Brimbank